Sphaerophorus a genus of lichenized fungi in the order Lecanorales.

Members of Sphaerophorus are commonly called ball lichens, coral lichens, or tree coral.

According to the Dictionary of the Fungi (10th edition, 2008), the widespread genus contains eight species.

References

Lecanorales
Lecanorales genera
Lichen genera
Taxa named by Christiaan Hendrik Persoon
Taxa described in 1794